The first Vallejo Flour Mill, in the Niles district of Fremont, California, was built in 1853 by José de Jesús Vallejo (1798–1882), elder brother of General Mariano Guadalupe Vallejo, on his Rancho Arroyo de la Alameda.  The Flour Mill was located at the mouth of Niles Canyon, then called Alameda Cañon, which served as the major course of Alameda Creek.  A second Flour Mill was built in 1856, the stone foundation of which may still be seen today.

The ruins of the Vallejo Flour Mill is located at the northeast corner of Niles Canyon Road (State Route 84) and Mission Boulevard (State Route 238) in Vallejo Mill Historical Park.  In 1932, it was designated a California Historical Landmark (#46).

A watercolor painting of the 1856 Flour Mill, done by Carmelita Vallejo, J & J Vallejo's daughter then finishing her studies at the San Jose Notre Dame Academy, showed several buildings surrounding a three-story Flour Mill building with a large wooden wheel on the north side.  According to the Alameda County Gazette (January 1857), the wheel was the overshot design, 30 feet in diameter and 8 feet broad, and the millstone was 4 feet in diameter.  The Flour Mill cost $5,000 and had a capacity of 150 barrels of flour a day.

Impact of the first transcontinental railroad

In 1865-1866, Western Pacific, one of three companies to build the first transcontinental railroad, built  of track north of San Jose towards Sacramento.  This  railroad segment skirted the Vallejo Flour Mills at the mouth of Alameda Cañon (now Niles Canyon) and reached halfway into the canyon, about a mile past the Farwell Bridge near milepost 33 where it stopped. The Western Pacific used 500 Chinese laborers to grade and construct the rail line into the rugged canyon with its tight curves and narrow banks. Four major timber through (Howe) truss bridges were built to cross Alameda Creek and Arroyo de la Laguna Creek.  In addition to building wooden bridges and grading the railroad bed, the laborers built culverts, retaining walls, and bridge piers in masonry.  In October 1866, construction was halted because of disagreements between the railroad’s contractors and its financiers. In June 1869, the Central Pacific Railroad, a subsidiary of which had acquired the Western Pacific and Oakland Point in 1868, restarted work on the railroad line through Alameda Cañon, also using Chinese laborers, and added a new line from the mouth of the canyon northwest towards Oakland.  

An aqueduct, built to carry water needed for the Vallejo Flour Mills, ran parallel to the present Niles Canyon Road.  When the construction of the first transcontinental railroad in the canyon resumed at the Mills in 1869, Central Pacific Railroad rebuilt the aqueduct in masonry.  More importantly, the railroad built a junction west of the mills and dwellings, called the Vallejo Mills Junction, to service both the 1869 transcontinental rail line as well as the 1866 Western Pacific San Jose line.  That same year, J & J Vallejo's son, Plutarco Vallejo, with surveyor Luis Castro, laid out the first subdivision of 23 lots along Vallejo Street south of the mills and dwellings.  The subdivision plat, dated 3 November 1869, was recorded as Vallejo Mills, a.k.a. Vallejo Mill, Vallejo's Mill, or Vallejo's Mills.  Also in November, the Transcript reported that a new town will be laid out on a quarter section of land, purchased by the railroad, at Vallejo Mills.

The settlement was located at the rail junction of two main lines: the then-new 1869 Central Pacific line that went northwest to Oakland and the older 1866 Western Pacific line south to San Jose.  After the completion of the First transcontinental railroad to the Pacific coast, Central Pacific renamed by December 1869 the Vallejo Mill station and junction as Niles, after their railroad attorney and stockholder, Addison Niles, who became two years later associate justice on the California Supreme Court.  Central Pacific also built in 1870 a railroad depot, complete with a restaurant and saloon, at the Niles junction for the convenience of the transferring train passengers.  Thereafter, the Vallejo Mills settlement became known as Niles and the byline Niles, Cal started to appear in newspapers by the mid-1870s.  In 1956, Niles became a district within the city of Fremont. 

  The people of Vallejo Mills in 1857 received their mail by way of Centreville until after the railroad was built.  Then the name of the place changed to Niles and an express office was established...  After... two years it was moved to the depot. It was not until 1873 that Niles had a Post-office, it opening in November of that year.   --handwritten account by Mrs. Snyder from Niles, 1904

Similarly, Alameda Cañon became known as Niles Canyon, after the Central Pacific renamed in 1869 the Vallejo Mill station near the mouth of the canyon, Niles.

See also
 Niles, a district in the City of Fremont, California
 Niles Canyon
 Niles Canyon Railway

References 

California Historical Landmarks
Buildings and structures in Fremont, California
Flour mills in the United States
Grinding mills in California